The first lady of Nigeria is an informal, but accepted title, held by the wife of the president of Nigeria. The current first lady is Aisha Buhari who has held the title since 29 May 2015. 

The Constitution of Nigeria does not create an office for the country's first lady or potential first gentleman. However, official funding and staff have been allocated to the first lady of Nigeria since the country's independence. The first lady is addressed by the title Her Excellency.

History
Stella Obasanjo is the only Nigerian first lady to have died in office.

First ladies of Nigeria

References

Nigeria

Politics of Nigeria